Sir Philipos Bertie Petrides (27 June 1881 – 19 April 1956), known as Philip Petrides, was a British colonial judge and administrator.

Petrides was born in Sydenham, London, the third son of Greek merchant Demetrius Nicetas Petrides (born in Symi, Ottoman Greece) and Ellen Bannerman of Hackney. He was educated in Dulwich and Brussels before being called to the bar at the Middle Temple in 1906.

After a decade practising at the Common Law Bar, Petrides was appointed Crown Prosecutor in the Seychelles, where he acted as Chief Justice in 1916–17 and 1918–19. He was Chief Justice of the Seychelles from 1920 to 1924 and Attorney–General of Nyasaland from 1924 to 1926. He served on the Supreme Court of Nigeria from 1926 to 1930, was Chief Justice of Mauritius from 1930 to 1936, and finally Chief Justice of the Gold Coast Colony from 1936 until 1944, when he retired and returned to England.

He was knighted in the 1936 New Year Honours.

In 1916, he married Clare Cosens, daughter of Mr. George Cosens. They had one son, Felix Bannerman Petrides, and one daughter, Pamela Rachel, who married Capt. Ernest Walter Davie Western.

References

1881 births
1956 deaths
British people of Greek descent
People educated at Dulwich College
Members of the Middle Temple
Attorneys-General of Nyasaland
Chief justices of Mauritius
Chief justices of Seychelles
Chief justices of Ghana
Knights Bachelor